Bertha Merfield (1869–1921) was an Australian painter and muralist. She was a founding member of the Twenty Melbourne Painters Society.

Biography 

Merfield was born in West Melbourne, Victoria on 30 January 1869 to Thomas and Isabella (née Wardman) Merfield. She studied at the Slade School in London, England and the National Gallery of Victoria Art School.  She made generous  loans of works from her collection to the inaugural exhibition of Castlemaine Art Gallery in 1913, including paintings by Tudor St George Tucker, Alexander Colquhoun, George Clausen, Frederick McCubbin and Blamire Young.

She was a member of the London Society of Mural Decorators and Painters in Tempera. In 1916 her mural for the Cafe Australia in Melbourne received public acclaim. The building was demolished in 1938.

Merfield was a founding member of the Twenty Melbourne Painters Society.

Merfield died on 20 September 1921 in Melbourne.

References

External links 

 Balcony and mural in the main dining hall, Café Australia, Melbourne
 Catalogue of an exhibition of decorative panels by Miss Bertha E. Merfield
 Resource list on Trove (National Library of Australia) for Merfield, Bertha E. (1869-1921)

1869 births
1921 deaths
19th-century Australian women artists
20th-century Australian women artists
Australian muralists
Australian women painters
Women muralists
19th-century Australian painters
20th-century Australian painters
Artists from Melbourne
Alumni of the Slade School of Fine Art
People from West Melbourne, Victoria
National Gallery of Victoria Art School alumni